Fight the Sky was an American post-hardcore band from Sacramento, California, best known for being the heavier side project of Papa Roach lead singer Jacoby Shaddix.

History 
Fight the Sky was conceived in the winter of 2002 between long time friends lead guitarist Wade Khail, drummer Jay Ingram, and bass guitarist Ali Abrishami. Khail and Ingram had been long time fixtures on the Sacramento, California music scene, Khail a guitar tech for hometown nu metal band Papa Roach since 1997, and Ingram running Ascensive Marketing and Promotions, promoting many of Sacramento's bands, clubs, and music publications. Having known each other from shows around Sacramento- Abrishami, Khail, and Ingram began talking about forming a band. Light conversation turned to action in early 2002 with the three writing what would become their debut album Seven Deadly Songs. Working with longtime friend, vocalist, and producer Jacoby Shaddix (who originally used the name John Doe), the band entered the Velvet Tone Studios in Sacramento between the months of January and February 2004. The band had signed a record deal with Papa Roach's self-owned label El Tonal Records. Since recording the album, however, no news regarding the fate of the band nor a release date for the album have been released.

Band members 
 Jacoby Shaddix – lead vocals
 Wade Khail – lead guitar, backing vocals
 Ali Abrishami – bass, backing vocals
 Jay Ingram – drums, percussion

Discography 
Seven Deadly Songs (2002)

External links 
 Fight the Sky on PureVolume

Rock music groups from California
American post-hardcore musical groups
Musical groups from Sacramento, California